Up from the Catacombs – The Best of Jane's Addiction is a best of compilation album by Jane's Addiction, released September 19, 2006, on Rhino.

Background 
The album contains previously released material from each of Jane's Addiction's albums; from their eponymous live debut to Strays.

The title is taken from lyrics featured in the song "Chip Away", released on Jane's Addiction.

Track listing
"Stop!" - taken from Ritual de lo Habitual, 1990
"Ocean Size" - taken from Nothing's Shocking, 1988
"Whores"  - taken from Jane's Addiction, 1987
"Ted, Just Admit It..." - taken from Nothing's Shocking
"Ain't No Right"  - taken from Ritual de lo Habitual
"Had a Dad" - taken from Nothing's Shocking
"Superhero" - taken from Strays, 2003
"Been Caught Stealing" - taken from Ritual de lo Habitual
"Just Because" - taken from Strays
"Three Days" - taken from Ritual de lo Habitual
"I Would For You" - taken from Jane's Addiction
"Classic Girl" - taken from Ritual de lo Habitual
"Summertime Rolls" - taken from Nothing's Shocking
"Mountain Song" - taken from Nothing's Shocking
"Pigs in Zen" - taken from Nothing's Shocking
"Jane Says (Live)" - taken from Kettle Whistle, 1997

Personnel

Band Members
Perry Farrell - vocals, harmonica
Dave Navarro - guitars, keyboards, bass
Stephen Perkins - drums, percussion
Eric Avery - bass, acoustic guitar
Chris Chaney - bass (tracks 7 & 9)

Compilation Production
Jane's Addiction - compilation producer
Mason Williams - compilation producer
Steven Baker - executive producer
Bill Inglot - sound producer, remastering
Dan Hersch - remastering
Digiprep - remastering
Lisa Liese - product manager
Steve Woolard - discographical annotation
Corey Frye - editorial supervision
Rachael Bickerton - business affairs
Hugh Brown - art direction, photography (booklet insides)
Mathieu Bitton - art direction, design
Scott Webber - art supervision
Roger Viollet - photography (digipack, booklet front & back cover)
Alessandra Quaranta - photo research
Karen LeBlanc - project assistance
Robin Hurley - project assistance
Kenny Nemes - project assistance
Matt Abels - project assistance
Julie Brunnick - project assistance
Jamie Young - project assistance
Jill Berliner - project assistance
Michelle Jubelirer - project assistance
Larrisa Friend - project assistance
Eric Greenspan - project assistance
Stephen Lowy - project assistance

References

Jane's Addiction albums
2006 compilation albums
Rhino Records compilation albums